Paul Michael Smith (born 9 November 1964) is an English former footballer who played in the Football League for Sheffield United, Stockport County, Port Vale, and Lincoln City. He was promoted out of the Third Division with Sheffield United in 1983–84, and won the Conference title with Lincoln City in 1987–88.

Career
Smith began his career at Sheffield United. Ian Porterfield's "Blades" finished 11th in the Third Division in 1982–83, before winning automatic promotion in 1983–84. United then finished 18th in the Second Division in 1984–85 and then rose up to seventh place in 1985–86. During the latter campaign, Smith scored five goals in seven Fourth Division games on loan at Les Chapman's Stockport County. He failed to revive his career at Bramall Lane under new manager Billy McEwan after returning from Edgeley Park. Smith joined John Rudge's Third Division Port Vale for a £10,000 fee in July 1986. He scored nine goals in 51 appearances in the 1986–87 season. However, after just three games into the 1987–88 season, he was sold on to Lincoln City for £40,000 (and a percentage of any future fee) in September 1987. Colin Murphy's "Imps" went on to finish the 1987–88 season as champions of the Conference, and were re-elected into the Football League. They then finished tenth in the Fourth Division in 1988–89 and 1989–90, before new boss Steve Thompson led the club to 14th in 1990–91, and then tenth once again in 1991–92. Lincoln missed out on the play-offs in 1992–93 after Bury pipped them to seventh place on goal difference. They then plummeted to 18th spot in 1993–94 under Keith Alexander's stewardship, before new boss Sam Ellis took them back up to 12th place in 1994–95. Smith scored 40 goals in 305 league and cup competitions during his six years at Sincil Bank. He later played in the Conference for Halifax Town and had a trial with Mansfield Town.

Career statistics
Source:

Honours
Sheffield United
Football League Third Division third-place promotion: 1983–84

Lincoln City
Football Conference: 1987–88

References

1964 births
Living people
Footballers from Rotherham
English footballers
Association football wingers
Sheffield United F.C. players
Stockport County F.C. players
Port Vale F.C. players
Lincoln City F.C. players
Halifax Town A.F.C. players
English Football League players
National League (English football) players